Peterson's chinchilla mouse (Euneomys petersoni) is a species of rodent in the family Cricetidae. It is found in west central and southern Argentina and nearby areas of Chile. The species is named after American paleontologist Olaf A. Peterson (1865–1933).

References

Euneomys
Mammals of Argentina
Mammals of Chile
Mammals described in 1903
Taxonomy articles created by Polbot